The 1952 East Texas State Lions football team was an American football team that represented East Texas State Teachers College—now known as Texas A&M University–Commerce–as a member of the Lone Star Conference (LSC) during the 1952 college football season. Led by second-year head coach Milburn Smith, the Lions compiled an overall record of 11–0 with a mark of 5–0 in conference play, winning the LSC title. East Texas State was invited to the Tangerine Bowl, where they beat Tennessee Tech.

Schedule

References

East Texas State
Texas A&M–Commerce Lions football seasons
Lone Star Conference football champion seasons
Citrus Bowl champion seasons
College football undefeated seasons
East Texas State Lions football